Credit Suisse Securities (USA) LLC v. Billing, 551 U.S. 264 (2007), was a decision by the Supreme Court of the United States, which held that the securities markets were exempt from the scope of antitrust laws.

Facts

Judgment
The Supreme Court held that creation of the United States Securities and Exchange Commission (SEC) implicitly exempted the regulated securities industry from antitrust lawsuits under other existing laws. Justice Thomas dissented, arguing that the laws creating the SEC explicitly mention that securities regulations are in addition to, not instead of, existing law.

See also
List of United States Supreme Court cases, volume 551
List of United States Supreme Court cases
 Credit Suisse First Boston (Europe) Ltd v Lister

Further reading

External links
 

United States Supreme Court cases
United States antitrust case law
United States securities case law
2007 in United States case law
Credit Suisse
U.S. Securities and Exchange Commission litigation
United States Supreme Court cases of the Roberts Court